Penicillium georgiense is a species of the genus of Penicillium which was isolated from soil of a sandy beach from the Batu Ferringhi beach on the Penang Island in Malaysia and it was also isolated soil of a peanut field in Georgia in the United States.

References

georgiense
Fungi described in 2009